Cerilli is an Italian surname. Notable people with the surname include:

Franco Cerilli (born 1953), Italian footballer
Marianne Cerilli (born 1961), Canadian politician

Italian-language surnames